The Hirsch report, the commonly referred to name for the report Peaking of World Oil Production: Impacts, Mitigation, and Risk Management, was created by request for the US Department of Energy and published in February 2005.
Some information  was updated in 2007.
It examined the time frame for the occurrence of peak oil, the necessary mitigating actions, and the likely impacts based on the timeliness of those actions.

Introduction 

"The peaking of world oil production presents the U.S. and the world with an
unprecedented risk management problem. As peaking is approached, liquid fuel prices and price volatility will increase dramatically, and, without timely mitigation, the economic, social, and political costs will be unprecedented. Viable mitigation options exist on both the supply and demand sides, but to have substantial impact, they must be initiated more than a decade in advance of peaking."

The lead author, Robert L. Hirsch, published a brief summary of this report in October 2005 for the Atlantic Council.

Projections 

A number of industry petroleum geologists, scientists, and economists were listed with their global peak production projection.  Later, in 2010, Hirsch developed a projection that global oil production  would begin to decline by 2015.

As of 2018, it was unclear whether world crude oil production had peaked. After exhibiting steady growth since the 2009 recession, oil production has been roughly stable between 2015 and 2017, with 75.1 million barrels per day in 2015, 75.4 mbpd in 2016 and 74.7 mbpd in 2017.

Mitigation 
Operating under the assumption that existing services must be sustained, the Hirsch report considered the effects of the following mitigation strategies as part of the "crash program":
 Fuel efficient transportation,
 Heavy oil/Oil sands,
 Coal liquefaction,
 Enhanced oil recovery,
 Gas-to-liquids.

Conclusions 
The report came to the following conclusions:
 World oil peaking is going to happen, and will likely be abrupt.
World production of conventional oil will reach a maximum and decline thereafter.
Some forecasters project peaking within a decade; others contend it will occur later.
Peaking will happen, but the timing is uncertain.
 Oil peaking will adversely affect global economies, particularly the U.S.
Over the past century, the U.S. economy has been shaped by the availability of low-cost oil.
The economic loss to the United States could be measured on a trillion-dollar scale.
Aggressive fuel efficiency and substitute fuel production could provide substantial mitigation.
 Oil peaking presents a unique challenge.
Without massive mitigation, the problem will be pervasive and long-term.
Previous energy transitions (wood to coal and coal to oil) were gradual and evolutionary.
Oil peaking will be abrupt and revolutionary.
 The problem is liquid fuels for transportation.
The lifetimes of transportation equipment are measured in decades.
Rapid changeover in transportation equipment is inherently impossible.
Motor vehicles, aircraft, trains, and ships have no ready alternative to  liquid fuels.
 Mitigation efforts will require substantial time.
Waiting until production peaks would leave the world with a liquid fuel deficit for 20 years.
Initiating a crash program 10 years before peaking leaves a liquid fuels shortfall of a decade.
Initiating a crash program 20 years before peaking could avoid a world liquid fuels shortfall.
Both supply and demand will require attention.
Sustained high oil prices will cause forced demand reduction (recession and unemployment).
Production of large amounts of substitute liquid fuels can and must be provided.
The production of substitute liquid fuels is technically and economically feasible.
 It is a matter of risk management.
The peaking of world oil production is a classic risk management problem.
Mitigation efforts earlier than required may be premature, if peaking is long delayed.
On the other hand, if peaking is soon, failure to initiate mitigation could be extremely damaging.
 Government intervention will be required.
The economic and social implications of oil peaking would otherwise be chaotic.
Expediency may require major changes to existing administrative and regulatory procedures.
 Economic upheaval is not inevitable.
Without mitigation, the peaking of world oil production will cause major economic upheaval.
Given enough lead-time, the problems are soluble with existing technologies.
New technologies will help, but on a longer time scale.
 More information is needed.
Effective action to combat peaking requires better understanding of the issues.
Risks and possible benefits of possible mitigation actions need to be examined.

Three scenarios 
 Waiting until world oil production peaks before taking crash program action leaves the world with a significant liquid fuel deficit for more than two decades.
 Initiating a mitigation crash program 10 years before world oil peaking helps considerably but still leaves a liquid fuels shortfall roughly a decade after the time that oil would have peaked.
 Initiating a mitigation crash program 20 years before peaking appears to offer the possibility of avoiding a world liquid fuels shortfall for the forecast period.

Applicability beyond the US, critical remarks

The Hirsch Report urged a crash program of new technologies and changes in manners and attitudes in the US and as well implying more research and development. The report cites a peaking crude oil supply as the main reason for immediate action.

During the significant oil price rise through 2007, a theme among several industry observers was that the price rise was only partially due to a limit in crude oil availability (peak oil). For example, an article by Jad Mouawad cited an unusual number of fires and other outages among U.S. refineries in the summer of 2007 which disrupted supply. However, a lack of refining capacity would only seem to explain high gasoline prices not high crude oil prices.  Indeed, if the refineries were unable to process available crude oil then there should be a crude oil glut that would reduce crude prices on international crude oil markets. Then again, sharp changes in crude oil prices can also be due to stock market volatility and fear over the security of future supplies, or, on the other hand, an anticipation by investors of a rise in the value of crude oil once refining capacity picks up again.

As for the global usefulness of the Hirsch conclusions, as of 2004, the US share of global oil consumption was about 26%, while its share of world population was only 4.3%; Europe used 11% of global oil while having about 6.8% of world population. An average car in Germany uses about 8.1 liter per 100 km; the US consumption 16.2 L. In US terms, 1 gallon delivers 44 miles in Germany but only 22 in the United States.

So far a part of the changes ultimately requested by Hirsch for the US have been already implemented in Europe (and cum grano salis in Asia). The difference had been much smaller at the start of the 70s. Europe adapted more after the various oil shocks and enhanced the changes by introducing much higher taxes on gasoline. The differences now are not only a lack of energy saving technologies, in car building and usage, and passive insulation of buildings in the US. The traditional significant differences in the setup and density of settlements, share of suburbs, use of public transport and consumer behavior have been widening. Taking this into account, a peak oil shock as outlined by Hirsch will have a much more severe outcome in the US compared to other parts of the world, especially Europe.

See also

 Energy conservation
 Energy crisis
 Marion King Hubbert, and the Hubbert curve
 Peak oil
 Olduvai theory

References

External links
 
Hirsch, Robert L.: Bezdek, Roger; Wendling, Robert (2010). "The Impending World Energy Mess" (Apogee Prime)
 US Govt Sponsored Peak Oil Report Draws Disturbing Conclusions 29. July 2005
 Interview with Robert Hirsch on Peak Oil: "A Significant Period of Discomfort" Allianz Knowledge Site, 20. June 2008
 Where is the Hirsch report by Richard Heinberg
 The Hirsch report in PDF HTML version
 Audio interview: Robert Hirsch on Peak Oil Mitigation
 Robert Hirsch bio
 September 2010 Robert Hirsch Press Release

Peak oil
Environmental reports
2005 works